Deinacanthon is a genus of flowering plants in the family Bromeliaceae, subfamily Bromelioideae. The genus name is from the Greek “deinos” - terrible and “anthos” - flower. It contains a single species, Deinacanthon urbanianum, native to Bolivia, Paraguay and Argentina.

References

External links
BSI Genera Gallery photos
FCBS Deinacanthon Photos

Bromelioideae
Bromeliaceae genera
Monotypic Poales genera